Anthony and Theodosius were sainted founders of the Russian and Ukrainian monasticism. They established the Kiev Pechersk Monastery in the mid-11th century. See Saint Anthony of Kiev and Theodosius of Kiev for details.

In the Eastern Orthodox Church, their names are often listed together and they are commemorated together on September 2, while each has his own feast day as well (July 10 for St. Anthony and May 3 for St. Theodosius).

Russian saints of the Eastern Orthodox Church